The King & Bear Classic at World Golf Village was a golf tournament on the Korn Ferry Tour. The tournament was one of several added to the Korn Ferry Tour schedule as part of adjustments due to the COVID-19 pandemic. It was played in June 2020 on the King & Bear Course at the World Golf Village near St. Augustine, Florida. Chris Kirk won the tournament by one stroke over Justin Lower.

Winners

References

External links
Coverage on the Korn Ferry Tour's official site

Former Korn Ferry Tour events
Golf in Florida
Recurring sporting events established in 2020
Recurring sporting events disestablished in 2020
2020 establishments in Florida
2020 disestablishments in Florida